Jean-François Jodar (born 2 December 1949) is a retired French footballer and manager.

External links
  Profile, statistics and pictures
  Profile, statistics and pictures

1949 births
Living people
People from Montereau-Fault-Yonne
French footballers
France international footballers
Stade de Reims players
RC Strasbourg Alsace players
Olympique Lyonnais players
French football managers
Hassania Agadir managers
FC Montceau Bourgogne players
2008 Africa Cup of Nations managers
Association football defenders
Footballers from Seine-et-Marne